The Sri Lanka Maha Bodhi Centre is a Sri Lankan Buddhist establishment in Chennai, India. It is located in Egmore. It is run by the Sri Lanka Maha Bodhi Society and serves as a monument of friendship between Sri Lanka and India.

The Maha Bodhi Society of India
The headquarters of the Maha Bodhi Society is located at Colombo. The Maha Bodhi Society of India was founded by Anagarika Dharmapala in May 1891 under the objective of restoring the ancient Buddhist shrines at places such as Gaya and Sarnath. He founded the Society's first center at Bodh Gaya and in various other cities, including the one at Chennai, with the objective of providing shelter, assistance and guidance to the devotees who visit Buddha Gaya annually. The Chennai centre was established with the money borrowed from Sir Kent, in favour of the Maha Bodhi Society—Sri Lanka.

The Buddha temple
Sri Lanka Maha Bodhi Centre is located at Kenneth lane opposite to Egmore Railway Station. A small temple of Buddha, named Buddha Vihar, is situated inside the building of the Maha Bodhi Society of India. It is the only Buddhist temple in Chennai. The temple has an 18-ft life-size statue of Lord Buddha in a standing posture (Abhya Mudra) in the main hall. The festival of "Vesak" is celebrated annually in the month of May and cultural programmes are held at the centre. The centre also has a free homeopathic clinic started by the then director of the Chennai Centre, Ven. Ellawala Nandisvara Nayaka Thera, who is also instrumental in building the temple.

On 14 May 2011, Maha Bodhi Nikethanaya, a lodging facility for Buddhist pilgrims from Sri Lanka, was inaugurated in the centre, as part of 2,600th Sri Sambuddhatva Jayanthi celebrations by the Sri Lanka Deputy High Commission in Chennai, which commemorates Buddha's enlightenment. The five-storeyed building was constructed at a cost of  65 million. The building has 32 rooms.

The centre is venerated as a popular temple of "Theravada" worship that is visited by about 120,000 to 150,000 people annually.

Attacks
In 1983, at the peak of the ethnic strife in Sri Lanka, a bomb was thrown into the premises by unknown persons.

On 24 January 2011, the centre was attacked by an unidentified group of about 10 to 15 persons at around 9:00 p.m. local time. It was thought to be retaliation against the alleged killing of two Indian fishermen by the Sri Lankan Navy off the Tamil Nadu coast in the past two weeks.

See also

 Deputy High Commission of Sri Lanka, Chennai
 Theravāda Buddhism
 Mahabodhi Temple
 Buddhist pilgrimage

References

Buildings and structures in Chennai
Tourist attractions in Chennai